William Lindeque (13 December 1910 – 26 June 1995) was a South African sprinter. He competed in the men's 4 × 400 metres relay at the 1936 Summer Olympics.

References

1910 births
1995 deaths
Athletes (track and field) at the 1936 Summer Olympics
South African male sprinters
South African male middle-distance runners
Olympic athletes of South Africa
Place of birth missing